Joseph Scott (15 March 1901 – 1972) was an English footballer who scored 12 goals from 46 appearances in the Football League playing as an inside right for Sunderland, Darlington and South Shields in the 1920s. He was also on the books of Ashington without playing for them in the League. His brother Tom also played for Darlington, among several other clubs.

References

1901 births
1972 deaths
Footballers from Newcastle upon Tyne
English footballers
Association football inside forwards
Sunderland A.F.C. players
Darlington F.C. players
Ashington A.F.C. players
South Shields F.C. (1889) players
English Football League players
Date of death missing
Place of death missing